Shin Dong-pa (born September 2, 1944) is a South Korean basketball coach, sports commentator, and former basketball player who competed at the men's basketball tournaments at the 1964 Summer Olympics and the 1968 Summer Olympics. He was also a member of the senior South Korean national team that won the gold medal at the 1969 FIBA Asian Cup. He also played with South Korea at the 1970 FIBA World Championship, where he finished as that tournament's top scorer. 

Shin played primarily as a shooting guard, during his playing career. He is considered to be one of the best Asian basketball players of all time.

Early life and education
Shin was born in Northern Korea, during Japanese rule, in what is now Anbyon County, in North Korea's South Hamgyong Province. He attended Whimoon High School and Yonsei University, where he graduated in 1967.

Club playing career
Shin played club basketball in South Korea, with Small Business Bank, from 1967 to 1974.

National team playing career
Shin is well-known in the Philippines, because he scored 50 points for South Korea, in a game against the Philippine national basketball team, at the 1969 FIBA Asian Cup's final, which was held in Bangkok. Shin's South Korean team won that tournament. That team returned home to South Korea, to a hero's welcome, and even met the South Korean President at the time, Park Chung-hee.

Shin also competed with the senior men's South Korean national basketball team at the 1964 Summer Olympics and the 1968 Summer Olympics. He also played with South Korea at the 1970 FIBA World Championship, which was held in Yugoslavia. South Korea finished in 11th place out of 13 teams at that tournament. Shin ended up being the top scorer at the tournament, scoring an average of 32.6 points per game.

Coaching and managing career
During the 1970s and 1980s, Shin worked as a women's basketball coach and team director. In 1991, Shin began to work as the founding director of the SBS Men's Basketball Team. He also worked as a men's basketball coach.

Sports commentating career
Shin has also worked as a sports commentator for basketball games, for the Seoul Broadcasting System (SBS), and as a vice chairman of the South Korean Basketball Association.

Career trajectory
South Korean men's national basketball team player: (1962–1974)
Small Business Bank Men's Basketball Team player: (1967–1974)
Pacific Chemical Women's Director: (1975–1991)
South Korean women's national team's Head coach: (1978–1988)
SBS Men's Basketball Team Deputy Director, Director: (1991–1997)
Seoul Broadcasting System (SBS) sports commentator: (1997–present)
South Korean Basketball Association's executive director: (1999)
South Korean Basketball Association's vice chairman: (2002)

References

External links
FIBA Profile 1
FIBA Profile 2
FIBA Profile 3
Sports-Reference.com Profile

1944 births
Living people
Asian Games bronze medalists for South Korea
Asian Games gold medalists for South Korea
Asian Games medalists in basketball
Basketball executives
Basketball players at the 1964 Summer Olympics
Basketball players at the 1966 Asian Games
Basketball players at the 1968 Summer Olympics
Basketball players at the 1970 Asian Games
Medalists at the 1966 Asian Games
Medalists at the 1970 Asian Games
Olympic basketball players of South Korea
Shooting guards
South Korean basketball coaches
South Korean men's basketball players
1970 FIBA World Championship players
Yonsei University alumni
Universiade medalists in basketball
Universiade silver medalists for South Korea
Medalists at the 1967 Summer Universiade